The 69th Regiment Illinois Volunteer Infantry was an infantry regiment that served in the Union Army during the American Civil War.

Service
The 69th  Illinois Infantry was organized at Camp Douglas at Chicago, Illinois and mustered into Federal service on June 16, 1862, for a term of three months.  It served  as camp guards of Camp Douglas during its time in service.

The regiment was mustered out on September 27, 1862.

Total strength and casualties
The regiment suffered 25 enlisted men who died of disease, for a total of 25 fatalities.

Commanders
Colonel Joseph H. Tucker - mustered out with the regiment.

See also
List of Illinois Civil War Units
Illinois in the American Civil War

Notes

References
The Civil War Archive

Units and formations of the Union Army from Illinois
1862 establishments in Illinois
Military units and formations established in 1862
Military units and formations disestablished in 1862